Common mode is a term in engineering with at least two independent meanings.

Of electrical signals,
Common-mode signal, a component of an analog signal with the same sign on two signal leads
Common-mode interference, interference that appears on both signal leads, or coherent interference that affects two or more elements of a network
Common-mode rejection ratio, the ratio of rejection of common mode signals to differential signals
Common mode failure is when one event causes multiple systems to fail